Sheppey FM 92.2 is an English community radio station and training centre on the Isle of Sheppey in Kent.

History
The station began as an internet station in 2012, and was awarded an FM licence by Ofcom in 2016. It began broadcasting on FM in April 2017.

Accolades
Volunteers at the station have been honoured by the crown. The station has been recognised at the Community Radio Awards, named Bronze "Station of the Year". Prince Charles and the Duchess of Cornwall visited the station, based in Sheerness' Heritage Pavilion's "Sheppey Community Media Centre" in February 2022.

See also
BRFM 95.6 FM

References

External links

Isle of Sheppey
Community radio stations in the United Kingdom
Radio stations in Kent
Sheerness